"My Heart Belongs to Me" is a popular song from 1977 (see 1977 in music). It was originally performed by the songwriter, Alan Gordon, but the more famous version of the song was recorded by American singer and actress Barbra Streisand.

Released as a single from her multi-platinum 1977 album, Superman, "My Heart Belongs to Me" peaked at number four on the Billboard Hot 100 chart the middle of that year. It spent four weeks at number one on the Billboard easy listening chart, Streisand's fourth number-one song on this survey.

The song was originally considered for Streisand's film version of A Star Is Born from the previous year, but it was not included on that project. Charlie Calello, the co-producer of "My Heart Belongs to Me", rehearsed the song with Streisand by playing piano while she sang the lyrics. The instrumental portion of the song was recorded first, then Streisand recorded her vocals along with the orchestration the next day.

Chart performance

Weekly charts

Year-end charts

See also
List of number-one adult contemporary singles of 1977 (U.S.)

References

External links
 

1977 singles
Barbra Streisand songs
Songs written by Alan Gordon (songwriter)
1977 songs
Columbia Records singles
Pop ballads